APEC Vietnam 2017 (Vietnamese: APEC Việt Nam 2017) was the year-long hosting of Asia-Pacific Economic Cooperation (APEC) meetings in Vietnam, which culminated with the APEC Economic Leaders' Meeting in Đà Nẵng, hosted at InterContinental Danang Sun Peninsula Resort. It marked the second time Vietnam played host to the APEC, having hosted the event previously in 2006.

Branding

The Vietnamese Ministry of Culture, Sports and Tourism and the National Committee for APEC 2017 through the Agency for Fine Arts, Photography and Exhibition organized a logo design contest for the APEC Vietnam 2017 summit. The contest ran from March to April 4, 2016 and was open to both amateur and professional Vietnamese artists. The organizers of the logo design contests required the entries to feature the phrase "APEC Vietnam 2017", highlight Vietnamese culture, as well as to represent the five components of the 2017 summit which are dynamism, creativity, action, unity, and movement to the future. 234 submissions from 92 candidates residing in 20 provinces and cities across Vietnam for the competition were received by the ministry.

The winning logo design was announced in January 2017. The selected design was conceptualized by a group working for Mark&B Vietnam, a branding agency. The winning logo depicts stylised images of paddles and Lạc birds, a common motif on drums of the ancient Đông Sơn culture. The placement of the elements suggest a circular movement which is meant to represent a "dynamic APEC".

Preparation
A Round Table Meeting with the theme, "Stronger Joint Action for APEC's Shared Vision", was held in Hanoi on December 17, 2015 by the Vietnamese Ministry of Foreign Affairs to discuss preparation efforts for the 2017 APEC Summit.

The People's Committee of Đà Nẵng, the host city of the Economic Leader's Meeting, approved a project to upgrade major roads in the city for the occasion. The project covered 34 streets in the city, with an estimated cost of around ₫243 billion or US$10.9 million. The Da Nang International Airport was also scheduled for completion in March.

During the 4th National Committee for APEC 2017 on April 13, 2016 in Hanoi, Deputy Prime Minister, Minister of Foreign Affairs of Vietnam Pham Binh Minh directed ministries and agencies to coordinate with other APEC member states especially Peru and Papua New Guinea, the hosts of the 2016 and 2018 summits respectively.

Events

Economic Leaders' Meeting
Attendees
This was the first APEC meeting for United States President Donald Trump, South Korean President Moon Jae-in, Hong Kong Chief Executive Carrie Lam, and New Zealand Prime Minister Jacinda Ardern, since their inaugurations on 20 January 2017, 10 May 2017, 1 July 2017 and 26 October 2017, respectively. It was also the last APEC meeting for Chilean President Michelle Bachelet, Peruvian President Pedro Pablo Kuczynski, Malaysian Prime Minister Najib Razak, Australian Prime Minister Malcolm Turnbull, Mexican President Enrique Peña Nieto, and for the host, Vietnamese President Trần Đại Quang, following the 2017 Chilean general election, Kuczynski's resignation, the 2018 Malaysian general election, the 2018 Australian leadership spill, the 2018 Mexican general election and Trần's death, respectively.

References

External links 

2017
2017 in economics
Economy of Vietnam
Diplomatic conferences in Vietnam
21st-century diplomatic conferences (Asia-Pacific)
2017 in international relations
2017 conferences
2017 in Vietnam
November 2017 events in Asia
History of Da Nang